VLO may refer to:

 VLO, The maximum landing gear operating speed
 VLo, The thalamus region of the brain
 VLo, vacuum solder system，Centrotherm products VLO6, VLO12, VLO20, VLO180, and VLO300. The size below 20 liter is application for institutes, universities. The size above 180 liter is application for manufacturing.
 Valero Energy, an oil company which trades on the NYSE as VLO